FE2 may refer to:

Video games
 Fire Emblem Gaiden, the second game in the Fire Emblem series.

Photography
 Nikon FE2, a Japanese 35mm camera made in 1983.

Aircraft
 Royal Aircraft Factory F.E.2, designation for three significantly different aircraft made during the first World War, only sharing a "Farman" biplane layout.